Niamh Fahey (born 13 October 1987) is an Irish footballer who plays as a defender or midfielder for Liverpool in the Women's Super League and the Republic of Ireland women's national football team. She has previously played for Chelsea. Before joining Chelsea in December 2014, Fahey spent six seasons with Arsenal Ladies. She has also won national cups playing Gaelic football with Galway Ladies Football. Niamh is the sister of Galway's 2001 All-Ireland-winning Gaelic football captain Gary Fahey.

Club career
Fahey began her career with her hometown club, Salthill Devon. She progressed through the ranks alongside future international teammate Méabh De Búrca. Both players helped Galway win the FAI Women's Cup in 2007. In the final against Raheny United, Fahey scored the winning penalty and also subdued the attacking threat of Raheny's Olivia O'Toole, in what RTÉ described as "a splendid individual display."

She joined Arsenal Ladies in August 2008. In her first season with the Gunners Fahey made 18 appearances, mostly at left full–back, as the club won a domestic treble.

On 19 December 2014, Fahey signed for Chelsea L.F.C. Fahey also won the All-Ireland in 2004 with Galway L.G.F.A.

International career
Fahey has won over 100 caps for the Republic of Ireland, having previously represented her country at Under-17 and Under-19 level. In March 2007, Fahey made her senior debut for Ireland in a 1–1 draw with Portugal in the opening match of the Algarve Cup. After becoming a regular in the team, Fahey was named FAI Women's Senior International Player of the Year in 2008, 2009 and 2011.

In April 2013, Fahey suffered an anterior cruciate ligament injury while playing for Arsenal. The 30 minutes she played for Ireland against the Basque Country in May 2014 was her first game back.

On 16 February 2022, she played her 100th match for Republic of Ireland in a 2–1 win over Poland in the 2022 Pinatar Cup. She scored her first ever goal for Ireland on the occasion of her 104th cap, in a 9–0 2023 FIFA Women's World Cup qualification – UEFA Group A win over Georgia in Gori on 27 June 2022.

Honours

 FA WSL: 3
2011, 2012 2015 FA WSL 
 FA Women's Premier League National Division: 2
2008–09, 2009–10
FA Women's Championship:1 
2021-22
FA Women's Cup: 5
2008–09, 2010–11, 2012–13, 2013–14, 2014–2015
FA WSL Cup: 3
2011, 2012, 2013
FA Women's Premier League Cup: 2
2008–09, 2014–15
GAA All-Ireland Women's title
2004

References

External links
 
 Niamh Fahey at fai.ie.

1987 births
Living people
Association footballers from County Galway
Republic of Ireland women's association footballers
Arsenal W.F.C. players
Chelsea F.C. Women players
Liverpool F.C. Women players
Republic of Ireland women's international footballers
FA Women's National League players
Expatriate women's footballers in England
Women's Super League players
Salthill Devon F.C. players
Galway W.F.C. players
Galway ladies' Gaelic footballers
Ladies' Gaelic footballers who switched code
Women's association football central defenders
Women's association football midfielders
Expatriate women's footballers in France
Irish expatriate sportspeople in France
Irish expatriate sportspeople in England
Division 1 Féminine players
FC Girondins de Bordeaux (women) players
Republic of Ireland women's youth international footballers
FIFA Century Club